Recologne may refer to several communes in France:

 Recologne, Doubs
 Recologne, Haute-Saône
 Recologne-lès-Rioz, in Haute-Saône